USS Alligator, the fourth United States Navy ship of that name, is the first known U.S. Navy submarine, and was active during the American Civil War (the first American submarine was  during the Revolutionary War, and was operated by the Continental Army, vice Navy, in 1776 against British vessels in New York harbor). During the Civil War the Confederate States Navy would also build their own submarine, .

Construction

In the autumn of 1861, the Union Navy asked the firm of Neafie & Levy to construct a small submersible ship designed by the French engineer Brutus de Villeroi, who also acted as a supervisor during the first phase of the construction (de Villeroi had designed and built submarines in France and one after immigrating to the United States).

"It was made of iron, with the upper part pierced for small circular plates of glass, for light, and in it were several water tight compartments". She was designed to carry 18 men. For propulsion, she was equipped with 16 hand-powered paddles protruding from the sides. On 3 July 1862, the Washington Navy Yard had the paddles replaced by a hand-cranked propeller, which improved its speed to about four knots. Air was supplied from the surface by two tubes with floats, connected to an air pump located inside the submarine; it was the first operational submarine to have an air purifying system. The boat had a forward airlock, and was the first operational submarine with the capability for a diver to leave and return while both remained submerged. Divers could affix mines to a target, then return and detonate them by connecting the mine's insulated copper wire to a battery inside the vessel.

The Union Navy wanted such a vessel to counter the threat posed to its wooden-hulled blockaders by the former screw frigate Merrimack which, according to intelligence reports, the Norfolk Navy Yard was rebuilding as an ironclad ram for the Confederacy. The Union Navy's agreement with the Philadelphia shipbuilder specified that the submarine was to be finished in not more than 40 days; its keel was laid down almost immediately following the signing on 1 November 1861 of a contract for her construction. Nevertheless, the work proceeded so slowly that more than 180 days had elapsed when the novel craft finally was launched on 1 May 1862.

Operational history

Soon after her launching, she was towed to the Philadelphia Navy Yard to be fitted out and manned. Two weeks later, she was placed under command of a civilian, Mr. Samuel Eakins. On 13 June, the Navy formally accepted the boat.

Next, the steam tug Fred Kopp was engaged to tow the submarine to Hampton Roads, Virginia. The two vessels got underway on 19 June and proceeded down the Delaware River to the Delaware and Chesapeake Canal, through which they entered the Chesapeake Bay for the last leg of the voyage, reaching Hampton Roads on the 23rd. At Norfolk, the submarine was moored alongside the sidewheel steamer , which was to act as her tender during her service with the North Atlantic Blockading Squadron. A spring 1862 newspaper report called the vessel Alligator, in part because of its green color, a moniker which soon appeared in official correspondence.

Several tasks were considered for the vessel: destroying a bridge across Swift Creek, a tributary of the Appomattox River; clearing away the obstructions in the James River at Fort Darling, which had prevented Union gunboats from steaming upstream to support General McClellan's drive up the peninsula toward Richmond; and blowing up  should that ironclad be completed on time and sent downstream to attack Union forces. Consequently, the submarine was sent up the James to City Point where she arrived on the 25th. Commander John Rodgers, the senior naval officer in that area, examined Alligator and reported that neither the James off Fort Darling nor the Appomattox near the bridge was deep enough to permit the submarine to submerge completely. Moreover, he feared that while his theater of operation contained no targets accessible to the submarine, the Union gunboats under his command would be highly vulnerable to her attacks should Alligator fall into enemy hands. He therefore requested permission to send the submarine back to Hampton Roads.

The ship headed downriver on the 29th and then was ordered to proceed to the Washington Navy Yard for more experimentation and testing. In August, Lt. Thomas O. Selfridge, Jr. was given command of Alligator and she was assigned a naval crew. The tests proved unsatisfactory, and Selfridge pronounced "the enterprise ... a failure".

President Lincoln observed the submarine in operation on 18 March 1863.

About this time, Rear Admiral Samuel Francis du Pont, who had become interested in the submarine while in command of the Philadelphia Navy Yard early in the war, decided that Alligator might be useful in carrying out his plans to take Charleston, South Carolina, the birthplace of secession. Acting Master John F. Winchester, who then commanded , was ordered to tow the submarine to Port Royal, South Carolina. The pair got underway on 31 March.

The next day, both encountered bad weather which, on 2 April, forced Sumpter to cut Alligator adrift off Cape Hatteras. She either immediately sank or drifted for a while before sinking, ending the career of the United States Navy's first submarine.

See also
 French weapons in the American Civil War

References

Veit, Chuck, "The Innovative, Mysterious Alligator" - Naval History magazine (August 2010), pp. 26–29

Attribution

External links
 navsource.org: USS Alligator
 NPR story on the hunt for the USS Alligator
 NOAA search for the Alligator
 Navy & Marine LHA history site on Alligator
 Full Story of the Appomattox River Raid
 UNDERSEA WARFARE Magazine article on Alligator
 Comprehensive site on world submarine history 

Ships built by Neafie and Levy
Submarines of the United States Navy
Alligator
19th-century submarines of the United States
Lost submarines of the United States
United States submarine accidents
1862 ships
Maritime incidents in April 1863
Shipwrecks of the Carolina coast
Shipwrecks in the Atlantic Ocean
Shipwrecks of the American Civil War
Hand-cranked submarines